The Kelly-D is an American homebuilt aircraft that was designed by Dudley R. Kelly of Versailles, Kentucky, in 1981. When it was available, the aircraft was supplied in the form of plans for amateur construction. Aircraft Spruce & Specialty Co still provides some spruce wing parts for the design.

Dudley R. Kelly died on 20 September 1998. After his death, his widow, Thelma Kelly continued selling plans for  a time; they are now sold by the Hatz Biplane Association.

Design and development
The Kelly-D is a development of the Hatz CB-1, but with more wingspan and fuselage length, and with more cockpit space for larger pilots. It features a strut-braced biplane layout, two seats in separate tandem open cockpits with individual windshields, fixed conventional landing gear and a single engine in tractor configuration.

The aircraft is made from a combination of 4130 steel tubing and wood, with all surfaces covered in doped aircraft fabric. The wings are detachable for ground transportation and storage. The standard engine used is the  Lycoming O-235 four stroke powerplant.

The designer estimated the construction time from the supplied kit as 4000 hours. In 1983, it could be built, with a used engine, for about US$8,000.

Operational history
By 1998 the Dudley reported that 20 kits were completed and flying.

In January 2014, 13 examples were registered in the United States with the Federal Aviation Administration, although a total of 16 had been registered at one time. Also in 2014 there was one registered with Transport Canada.

Specifications (Kelly-D)

References

External links
Photo of a Kelly-D

Dudley R Kelly aircraft
1980s United States sport aircraft
Single-engined tractor aircraft
Biplanes
Homebuilt aircraft